Devouring The Prophecy is the debut studio album by the Californian brutal death metal band Odious Mortem.

This is the band's first release, following their self-released demo Gestation of Worms.

Tracks
 Debacle by Cephalopod	- 03:21	
 Caverns of Reason - 03:00
 Nothing Beyond the Rot - 02:01
 Golden Excretion - 02:18
 Thought Disruption - 01:45
 Carpal Tunnel - 01:40
 Third Pawn - 01:32
 Morton's Neuronoma - 02:18
 Also featured in the Odious Mortem demo Gestation of Worms
 Gristle Dripping Scab - 02:10
 Cerebral Dissection - 03:28

Reception
The album was generally well received by listeners, but many professional critics did not review it. However, its positive reception led to high demand for their second album.

Personnel
 Dan Eggers – guitars, bass, vocals
 David Siskin – guitars, vocals
 KC Howard – drums, vocals

References

External links
 Odious Mortem official website

2005 albums
Odious Mortem albums